Porezen (in older sources also Porzen) is a dispersed settlement on the northern slopes of a hill also named Porezen above the Bača Valley in the Municipality of Tolmin in the Littoral region of Slovenia.

References

External links
Porezen on Geopedia

Populated places in the Municipality of Tolmin